Survivor A-Sziget 2 was the second and final season of the Hungarian version of Survivor which was broadcast on RTL Klub from August 25, 2004 to December 3, 2004. Although the show had the title Survivor, the tribe names of North and South reflected those traditionally used in Expedition Robinson. During the pre-merge portion of the program both teams proved strong as each won three of the immunity challenges. When the tribes merged the members of the North team stuck together while those of the South team initially did not. Starting with the seventh tribal council the twist of the "black vote" came into play. The black vote gave a person voted out at one tribal council to cast a vote at the next. Ultimately, the alliance of Anna, Dávid, Miklós, and Péter proved dominant in the later stages of the game as it picked off those that were not in it while only suffering one pre-final four casualty of its own (Péter had to be evacuated in episode 9). When it came time for the final four the contestants took part in two challenges to determine the final two. Viki and Miklós lost these challenges and were eliminated. Despite the fact that there was a jury this year, they were deadlocked in there vote and ultimately it was Dávid Hankó who won this season after receiving 52.56% of the public vote (39,992 votes) to Anna's 47.44% (36,090 votes).

Finishing order

Voting history

 Starting with the seventh tribal council and continuing until the twelfth tribal council, the contestant voted out at the previous tribal council was permitted to vote.

 At the eleventh tribal council, both Anna and István received three votes. Because of this they were forced to draw lots in order to determine who would be eliminated.

External links
https://web.archive.org/web/20050915170101/http://www.online.rtlklub.hu/survivor2/

Hungary
2004 Hungarian television seasons